Lanier Middle School may refer to:

Bob Lanier Middle School, formerly Sidney Lanier Junior High School/Middle School, in Houston, Texas, United States
Lanier Middle School (Sugar Hill, Georgia) in Sugar Hill, Georgia, United States
Lanier Middle School (Fairfax, Virginia) in Fairfax, Virginia, United States